Madhur Khatri (born 25 June 1987) is an Indian cricketer who played for Rajasthan. Ahead of the 2018–19 Ranji Trophy, he transferred from Rajasthan to Railways.

References

External links
 

1987 births
Living people
Indian cricketers
Railways cricketers
Rajasthan cricketers
People from Bikaner